Five Islands Village is a village located on the northwest coast of Antigua, within Saint John Parish in Antigua and Barbuda.

Geography
The village is on a peninsula, and was named for the five rock islands adjacent in Five Island Harbour. The village is surrounded by 12 of the 365 beaches on Antigua.

The highest point in the village is Mount Barrington, the location of Fort Barrington. The fort was named after British Admiral Barrington, who captured Caribbean St. Lucia island from the French in 1667. The fort was built during the colonial British Antigua and Barbuda period, mainly as a lookout for any foreign battleships in the area.

Demography 
Five Islands has a population of 337 people as of 2011, many of whom are employed in farming or fishing. The village is home to several sportsmen, including Richie Richardson, the cricketer and West Indies region coach. 

There is one primary school, Five Islands Primary School, in the village. The University of the West Indies opened its fourth physical campus at Five Islands in 2019, serving Antigua and Barbuda and other Eastern Caribbean countries.

Census Data (2011) 
There is one enumeration district, Five Islands (ED 36000)

29.07% of households in Five Islands have access to the internet. 72.90% of households own a mobile phone.

Tourism 
The village has one of the oldest ongoing hotels on the island.

The Five Islands peninsula's coast along Five Island Harbour is renowned for its turquoise waters. It has a series of coves and with beaches and resorts.

References

External links 
 VisitAntiguaBarbuda.com: Mount Obama and Fort Barrington 

Populated places in Antigua and Barbuda
Saint John Parish, Antigua and Barbuda
Beaches of Antigua and Barbuda